Ambica Shrestha is a Nepalese entrepreneur. Shrestha is the president of Dwarika´s Hotels and Resorts.

Shrestha, who was born in Darjeeling, India, got her secondary education in St. Joseph. She settled in Nepal after marrying Dwarika Das Shrestha, an artist. With the help of Ambica, Shrestha founded a high-end heritage hotel with a collection of antique art.

Shrestha managed the hotel she had established with her husband after his death in 1991.
Ambica is working as honorary consulate General of Spain for Nepal  She also serves as the head of Nepalese Heritage Society and Business and Professional Women Nepal and works to preserve the cultural heritage of Nepal and improve the lot of underprivileged women.

References

Nepalese women